Miyazaki Prefectural Gymnasium is an arena in Miyazaki, Miyazaki, Japan. It was the home arena of the Miyazaki Shining Suns of the bj league, Japan's professional basketball league.

References

Basketball venues in Japan
Indoor arenas in Japan
Sports venues in Miyazaki Prefecture
Miyazaki (city)